Nano Energy is a monthly peer-reviewed scientific journal covering nanotechnology and energy. It was established in 2012 and is published by Elsevier. The editor-in-chief is Zhong Lin Wang (Georgia Institute of Technology).

Abstracting and indexing
The journal is abstracted and indexed in:

According to the Journal Citation Reports, the journal has a 2021 impact factor of 19.069.

References

External links

Materials science journals
Publications established in 2012
English-language journals
Monthly journals
Elsevier academic journals
Nanotechnology journals